Hacienda Jacó Airport  is a grass airstrip in Playa Hermosa, Garabito Canton, Puntarenas Province, Costa Rica.

The airport is the nearest airfield to Jacó, an important beach destination but on short distance to San José, making most of the travelers to reach this coastal city by land transportation. Even though, Hacienda Jacó Airport is seldom referred as Jacó Airport.

There are no scheduled flights to Hacienda Jacó Airport but the airfield is famous for recreative activities. A skydiving company held its base in Hacienda Jacó Airport.

In 2014, 231 passengers traveled through Hacienda Jacó Airport.

Passenger Statistics
These data show number of passengers movements into the airport, according to the Directorate General of Civil Aviation of Costa Rica's Statistical Yearbooks.

References

External links
[xhIs6EUuSjI Piper Pacer dos ciscuitos Wheel Landing MRJO Jaco] - YouTube video with landing and take off from MRJO

Airports in Costa Rica
Buildings and structures in Puntarenas Province